Durangarchips is a genus of moths belonging to the family Tortricidae.

Species
Durangarchips druana (Walsingham, 1914)

See also
List of Tortricidae genera

References

External links
tortricidae.com

Archipini
Tortricidae genera